En la Línea del Frente (Spanish: on the front line) is the sixth studio album by street punk band The Casualties, and is a Spanish remake of the predecessor "On the Front Line", the mother tongue of vocalist Jorge.

Track listing
Casualties Armada - 1:16
Botas - 2:23
Jefes - 2:32
Clase Criminal - 3:15
Futuro Destruido - 2:50
Soldado - 3:05
Vida Perdida - 2:13
(Punk) Música del Pueblo - 2:27
Control de la Prensa - 2:13
Guerra y Odio - 2:15
Tragedia del Amor - 3:00
Cerebro Lavado - 2:16
Rebelde de Oi! Día - 2:29
Sonidos de Mi Barrio - 2:34

The Casualties albums
SideOneDummy Records albums
2005 albums
Rock en Español albums